Solfrid Johansen (born 9 February 1956) is a Norwegian sport rower. She was born in Sandefjord. She competed at the 1976 Summer Olympics in Montreal, where she placed fourth in the double sculls together with Ingun Brechan. She competed at the 1984 Summer Olympics in Los Angeles, where she placed fifth in the double sculls, together with Haldis Lenes.

References

1956 births
Living people
People from Sandefjord
Norwegian female rowers
Olympic rowers of Norway
Rowers at the 1976 Summer Olympics
Rowers at the 1984 Summer Olympics
Sportspeople from Vestfold og Telemark